Ye Qun (2 December 1917 – 13 September 1971) was the wife of Lin Biao, the Vice Chairman of Chinese Communist Party who controlled China's military power along with Chairman Mao Zedong. She was mostly known for taking care of politics for her husband.  Ye was a member of the 9th Politburo of the Chinese Communist Party. She died with Lin Biao and their son Lin Liguo in a plane crash over Mongolia on September 13, 1971. They also had a daughter, Lin Liheng (Doudou), who was not on the airplane.

Early life
Ye Qun was born in Minhou County, Fujian Province. In 1935, she attended a middle school affiliated with the Beijing Pedagogical University and took part in the anti-Japanese demonstrations by Beijing students on December 9, 1935. Early in the Second Sino-Japanese War, she briefly joined one of the Kuomintang youth organizations. She later went to Yan'an and joined the Chinese Communist Party in 1938.

In 1942, Ye Qun married Lin Biao, with whom she had two children: son Lin Liguo (林立果) and daughter Lin Liheng (林立恒).

Political career

During the Chinese Civil War, she served as staff officer, secretary, translator and other positions in the headquarters of the units within People's Liberation Army. Following the founding of the People's Republic of China in 1949, Ye Qun took on the role of Lin Biao's secretary. From that time on, she began to actively participate in political activities. She served as the deputy director of the General Education Department within the Ministry of Education. She later served deputy director of the Shanghai Municipal Education Bureau and deputy director of the Guangzhou Education Bureau.

In 1960, he returned to Beijing from Guangzhou and served as director of Lin Biao's office. In late 1965, she assisted Lin Biao in bringing down his adversary, Luo Ruiqing, the Chief of the General Staff of the People's Liberation Army. As a result, although she was not a member of the CCP Central Committee at the time, she attended a Politburo meeting in December 1965. During the meeting, she was given the floor three times and over a period of about ten hours she enumerated the "offenses" of Luo Ruiqing, who according to the Ye, misinterpreted Maoism and tried to launch a coup to remove Lin Biao from power in the Ministry of Defense.

After 1967, Ye Qun was first a member of the All Army's Cultural Revolution Group and later the leader of this group. In addition, she was one of the four founding members of the Administrative Bureau of the Central Military Commission, which was formed in August 1967. In 1969, she was acceded to the 9th Politburo of the Communist Party of China, making her and Jiang Qing the first Chinese women to reach such a post of political responsibility. Ye was appointed a member of the CCP Central Committee and chairman of the administrative office of the Central Military Commission. Simon Leys considers that her accession to the Politburo, with the sole reason of being married to Lin Biao, is proof of the “decline of the regime".

French Sinologist Jean-Luc Domenach characterizes her as:

"a real educational background, the aspirations of midinette, the taste for money, the fear of her husband, an unlimited admiration for her son and finally panic in the face of danger."

Project 571 and death
During the Cultural Revolution, tensions between Jiang Qing and Lin Biao's faction escalated. According to Party documents, in early 1971, it was Ye Qun who asked her son Lin Liguo to assassinate Mao Zedong during his trip to Shanghai, as part of the plan known as Project 571. The attempt failed, as Mao suddenly changed his plans and returned to Beijing on the evening of September 12. This led to Ye Qun believe that the plan had been exposed. Following the failure of their plans, Ye Qun, Lin Liguo and Lin Biao decided to flee, but their daughter Lin Liheng revealed their escape plan to Premier Zhou Enlai.

Presumably fearing to lose time, the Lin family, including Lin Biao, Ye Qun, and Lin Liguo, fled in a PLAAF Hawker Siddeley Trident, from Qinhuangdao Shanhaiguan Airport on September 13, 1971.

Further information from the Party documents later released state:
"the plane was making for the Soviet Union but was inadequately fueled for such a trip; it also had on board neither navigator nor radio operator. It crashed in Mongolia on September 13, 1971, burning to death all on board."

However, according to the historian J. D. Spence, "this story is essentially beyond verification, since the photographs later released by the Chinese authorities are of dubious authenticity and details on Lin Biao’s exact plans and on the other plotters are blurred" The government narrative also does not sufficiently explain how and why Lin Biao's plane crashed. It is also still unclear whether Lin Biao himself planned a coup, or whether his Ye Qun and Lin Liguo had such plans and did not inform Lin Biao about it. Skeptics have claimed that Lin's decision to flee to the Soviet Union was illogical, on the grounds that the United States or Taiwan would have been safer destinations.

On August 20, 1973, the Central Committee of the Chinese Communist Party posthumously expelled Ye Qun from its ranks. In 1981, the Supreme People's Court confirmed her as the principal ringleader of the Lin Biao 'counter-revolutionary group'.

See also
Project 571
Jiang Qing

References

1917 births
1971 deaths
Chinese women in politics
Chinese Communist Party politicians from Fujian
Lin Biao family
Members of the 9th Politburo of the Chinese Communist Party
People of the Cultural Revolution
People's Republic of China politicians from Fujian
Politicians from Fuzhou
Spouses of national leaders
Victims of aviation accidents or incidents in China
Victims of aviation accidents or incidents in Mongolia
Victims of aviation accidents or incidents in 1971
Expelled members of the Chinese Communist Party
Chinese colonels
Chinese female military personnel